Globe University and Minnesota School of Business (Globe/MSB) was a private for-profit education network based out of Washington County, Minnesota, providing specialized training programs in business, accounting, medical, legal, information technology, massage, veterinary technology, and design fields. The large network had multiple campuses in Minnesota, Wisconsin, and South Dakota.

In September 2016, the state of Minnesota stopped the business from operating in the state. All Globe/MSB locations were permanently closed by 2017 because they lost their federal student aid funding.

History

Minnesota School of Business 
Minnesota School of Business was founded in 1877 by Professor Alexander R. Archibald, previously of Dartmouth College. He and an assistant taught classes in bookkeeping, shorthand, English, and penmanship in a three-room school in Minneapolis, Minnesota. For 12 years the school was called Archibald Business College. In 1890 the school was purchased by Charles T. Rickard and Grove A. Gruman and moved to larger facilities in the Jewelers’ Exchange Building in Minneapolis.

In 1929, the school was sold to the Correll and Kamprath families and was relocated to 24 South Seventh Street. In 1979 the School was moved again to the Chamber of Commerce Building  in Minneapolis.

ITT Educational Services Inc. purchased the school in 1969. Terry L. Myhre purchased the school in January 1988.

All Minnesota School of Business locations were permanently closed as of 2017.

Globe University 
Globe College was founded in 1885 by Frank A. Maron, who was born and educated in Germany. An accomplished scholar, he received a classical education in his native country. Recognizing a need for a practical education for young men and women, he established Globe College in Minnesota. From its inception, the university stressed the teaching of business as it is practiced. In October 1972, Helmer Myhre and Terry Myhre purchased the college.  In June 2007, it was renamed Globe University.

All Globe University locations were permanently closed as of 2017.

Lawsuits leading to closure
In 2011, Heidi Weber, a former dean, filed a whistleblower-wrongful termination lawsuit against Globe/MSB and, in 2013, her case went to jury trial in the Washington County Courthouse. After a seven day trial, a jury awarded $395,000 plus interest to the former dean in what is now called the first for-profit higher education whistleblower case/trial.

Globe/MSB appealed the ruling; however, the Minnesota Supreme Court upheld Weber's verdict and a judge ruled that Globe/MSB must additionally pay in excess of $995,000 (including attorney costs for Weber) for wrongful termination after she blew the whistle and was retaliated against for exposing the school's unethical practices.

In July 2014, Minnesota Attorney General Lori Swanson announced that the state was suing Globe/MSB. The lawsuit "[alleges that] the for-profit schools misled criminal justice program students about their career prospects." The suit contends that the school used high pressure sales tactics and misled students regarding the acceptance of their degrees and credits for the careers the students wanted. In 2013, the schools were sued by former students making similar allegations.
Globe/MSB disputed the allegations.

In 2016, Globe/MSB closed several campuses which was attributed to the lawsuit and a "three-year negative publicity campaign." The following year, the Minnesota Supreme Court found that student loans offered by the school, which carried interest rates as high as 18 percent, were illegal and that the schools issued the loans without the proper license.

In June 2018, the Minnesota Court of Appeals held that the "schools in this matter engaged in wrongful conduct in violation of the MCFA" but only upheld damages for students who testified at trial. However, in November 2019, the Minnesota Supreme Court ruled that any of the students who attended the criminal justice programs since 2009 can request reimbursement for tuition, fees, and other education-related expenses, including interest. A couple of weeks after the ruling, Globe/MSB filed for Chapter 11 bankruptcy protection, saying they owe many millions of dollars in connection with the awards against the school.

Academics 
Globe University and Minnesota School of Business awarded Doctor of Business Administration, Master of Science in Management, Master of Business Administration, bachelor of science and associate in applied science degrees, diplomas, and certificates.

Campus locations

The Minnesota School of Business-Richfield also housed the Minnesota School of Business-Online Division and Globe University-Online Division.

Affiliations
The Minnesota School of Business and Globe University were part of the now defunct Globe Education Network.
Educational affiliates had included:

 Broadview University; campus located in West Jordan, Utah
 Duluth Business University; closed in June 2018
 Benchmark Learning; closed in September 2016
 Minnesota School of Cosmetology; campus located in Woodbury, Minnesota
 Institute of Production and Recording; campuses located in Minneapolis, Minnesota and Edina, Minnesota

Broadview University, Minnesota School of Cosmetology, and the Institute of Production and Recording are now part of the Broadview Education Consortium which is owned by Terry Myhre and his family, who had previously owned the Globe Education Network.

References

External links 
 Official site
 Minnesota School of Business

Defunct universities and colleges in Minnesota
Former for-profit universities and colleges in the United States
Educational institutions established in 1877
Colleges accredited by the Accrediting Council for Independent Colleges and Schools
1877 establishments in Minnesota
Educational institutions disestablished in 2017
2017 disestablishments in Minnesota